Simon Phillips (born 7 May 1980) is an Irish actor born in Tuam, Co Galway working mainly in independent British films. He has starred in movies such as How to Stop Being a Loser, Jack Falls and The Rise and Fall of a White Collar Hooligan.

Filmography

Films

TV

External links
 

1980 births
British male film actors
British male television actors
Living people
British people of Irish descent